Lorna Stucki is a British singer.

She began her singing career at the Downbeat Piano bar in Frith Street, next door to Ronnie Scott's at the age of 21. As an untrained blues singer, she made the underground piano bar scene her domain for many years when she began a musical collaboration with André Shapps. In 1990 she signed a one single deal with EastWest Records with the cover version: "Last Night a D.J. Saved My Life" with Eusebe, Olimax and  DJ Shapps. The track went to 35 in the UK charts. In 1991 Lorna Stucki was invited by Mick Jones to sing on the song "The Tea Party" from The Globe album.

References

British women singers
Year of birth missing (living people)
Living people
Place of birth missing (living people)